Tim Calkins may refer to:

 Tim Calkins (professor) (born 1965), professor of marketing at Northwestern University
 Tim Calkins (wrestler), professional wrestler